Julio Graffigna (9 July 1931 – 4 April 2015) was an Argentine wrestler. He competed at the 1960 Summer Olympics, the 1964 Summer Olympics and the 1968 Summer Olympics.

References

External links
 

1931 births
2015 deaths
Argentine male sport wrestlers
Olympic wrestlers of Argentina
Wrestlers at the 1960 Summer Olympics
Wrestlers at the 1964 Summer Olympics
Wrestlers at the 1968 Summer Olympics
Sportspeople from Buenos Aires
Pan American Games medalists in wrestling
Pan American Games silver medalists for Argentina
Wrestlers at the 1959 Pan American Games
Wrestlers at the 1963 Pan American Games
Wrestlers at the 1967 Pan American Games
20th-century Argentine people
21st-century Argentine people